Reesjan Pasitoa (born 3 December 2001) is an Australian professional rugby union player. He currently plays for the Western Force in Super Rugby, having previously played for the Brumbies. His usual position is fly-half.

Early life
Raised in Perth, Western Australia, Reesjan Pasitoa played his junior rugby with the Perth-Bayswater club and Trinity College, East Perth. He moved to Queensland in 2017 to attend St Joseph's College, Nudgee on a rugby scholarship for his final three years of school. Pasitoa guided Nudgee to consecutive GPS premierships in 2017 and 2018, kicking the game-winning goal against arch-rivals Gregory Terrace in his first season.

He was selected for the 2018 Australian Schools & Under-18 team and played in Brisbane against Tonga and New Zealand, before playing on their successful Northern Hemisphere tour against Scotland and Ireland. In the following year, he steered the team to away victories over Fiji and New Zealand in Hamilton.

Rugby career
Pasitoa joined the Brumbies squad in Canberra ahead of the 2020 season. He had actually signed with the team in late 2018 but still had one year of school left to complete.

He signed with the Western Force after the 2021 season, in a return home to Perth where he had first started playing rugby.

Notes

References

External links
 Reesjan Pasitoa profile on It's Rugby

2001 births
Australian rugby union players
Living people
Rugby union fly-halves
ACT Brumbies players
Western Force players
Rugby union players from Perth, Western Australia